The following is a list of Teen Choice Award winners and nominees for Choice Movie Actor - Action. This award was first introduced  in 2002.

2010s

Ref

Action Actor